The 1910 Wisconsin gubernatorial election was held on November 8, 1910.

Republican nominee Francis E. McGovern defeated Democratic nominee Adolph J. Schmitz and Socialist nominee William A. Jacobs, with 50.57% of the vote.

Primary elections
Primary elections were held on September 6, 1910.

Democratic primary

Candidates
Adolph J. Schmitz, lawyer, Democratic nominee for Lieutenant Governor in 1894, unsuccessful candidate for Democratic nomination for Governor in 1908

Results

Republican primary

Candidates
Henry W. Barker, State Senator
Edward T. Fairchild, State Senator
William Mitchell Lewis, automobile manufacturer
Francis E. McGovern, former District attorney
John Strange, incumbent Lieutenant Governor

Results

Socialist primary

Candidates
William A. Jacobs, Social-Democratic nominee for Wisconsin's 1st congressional district in 1908

Results

Prohibition primary

Candidates
Byron E. Van Keuren, Prohibition nominee for Wisconsin's 8th congressional district in 1908

Results

General election

Candidates
Major party candidates
Francis E. McGovern, Republican
Adolph J. Schmitz, Democratic

Other candidates
Byron E. Van Keuren, Prohibition
William A. Jacobs, Socialist (Social-Democratic Party of Wisconsin)
Fred G. Kremer, Socialist Labor

Results

References

Bibliography
  
 
 

1910
Wisconsin
Gubernatorial
November 1910 events